Charles Ted Sitton Sr. (January 30, 1932 – April 15, 2016) was an American football coach.  He was the 12th head football coach at Abilene Christian University in Abilene, Texas, serving for six seasons, from 1979 to 1984, and compiling a record of 33–28–1.

Head coaching record

References

External links
 

1932 births
2016 deaths
American football quarterbacks
Abilene Christian Wildcats football coaches
Abilene Christian Wildcats football players
People from Stamford, Texas
Coaches of American football from Texas
Players of American football from Texas